The Walrond and Elizabeth Snell House (also known as the William and Carolyn Ladd House) is a historic house located at 402 South Lake Street in Miles City, Montana.

Description and history 
It was built in the Folk Victorian style in 1882–83.  It is a two-story house built with load-bearing brick walls, with a two-story frame addition at its south east end. It was added to the National Register of Historic Places on September 11, 2003.

The house is described in its 2003 NRHP nomination as "unassuming" but deemed notable as:...it is one of the first masonry residences in Miles City, and its construction coincides with the first wave of economic development in the area, as well as the arrival of the railroad. A major remodel of the house between 1910 and 1916 is reflective of the economic prosperity realized in the area during that time. The Snell family, successful and influential in the sheepraising and banking businesses, purchased the property in 1891, and enjoyed a long and prosperous association with the community. The building is also eligible for listing ... as a representative example of Late Victorian architecture, and its association with the first and most prominent architect in Miles City, Byron Vreeland.

References

Houses in Custer County, Montana
Houses on the National Register of Historic Places in Montana
Buildings and structures in Miles City, Montana
National Register of Historic Places in Custer County, Montana
Houses completed in 1883
Victorian architecture in Montana